S. H. (Samuel Henry) Ervin, (21 January 1881 – 29 October 1977), wool broker, collector and philanthropist, was born on 21 January 1881 at Monkland, Queensland. Generally known as Harry, Ervin was the youngest son of Samuel Ervin and his wife, Matilda. His father died in the same year. His mother later remarried and, during his youth, Harry used his stepfather's surname, Rohde.

The Rohde family moved to Mosman, a Sydney suburb, and Ervin attended Sydney Church of England Grammar School (Shore).

After he left school, Ervin went to Europe where he worked in woollen mills, before returning to Australia. During World War I he took over Lothringer & Co., a firm in which his brother-in-law Karl Lothringer was involved and, in 1927, established S. H. Ervin Limited, wool brokers.

In World War II Ervin contributed to the war effort as a wool appraiser. His firm later benefited from the post-war wool boom.

Philanthropy 
Due to his association with artists at Sirius Cove, Ervin purchased works by a number of artists, including Norman Lindsay, Tom Roberts and Arthur Streeton.

In the 1960s Ervin became a substantial benefactor. In 1962 he gave his collection of paintings to the Australian government and encouraged the erection of a national art gallery. In 1971 he donated $50,000 to the New South Wales branch of the National Trust of Australia to purchase Norman Lindsay's home at Faulconbridge, New South Wales and, in 1974, donated $200,000 to restore two buildings at Observatory Hill, Sydney as an art gallery and museum. The buildings were named the S. H. Ervin Gallery.

Ervin Place in the Canberra suburb of Conder is named in his honour.

Personal life 

On 7 April 1926 Ervin married 38-year-old Muriel Beatrice Gray, nee Appel, who had two daughters from her previous marriage. The Ervins lived at Glanworth, Darling Point, and later at The Astor, Macquarie Street, Sydney.

Ervin outlived his wife and stepdaughters and died on 29 October 1977.

See also 
 S. H. Ervin Gallery

References 

1881 births
1977 deaths
Australian philanthropists
20th-century philanthropists